Inverarnan is a small hamlet in Stirling, Scotland, near the village of Crianlarich and the hamlet of Ardlui, Argyll and Bute. It is the only settlement in the historical county of Perthshire which has a G postcode.

The Drovers Inn 
The Drovers Inn is a hotel in Inverarnan. It is known for being one of Scotland's most haunted pubs. In 2012, the pub was nearly shut down due to unpaid taxes.

Inverarnan Canal 
From 1844 until around the mid-1860s steamships called at Inverarnan via the short Inverarnan Canal that branched off the River Falloch.

References

External links 
Video footage of the Drovers Inn
Video footage of the Old Garabal Landing
Video footage of the Inverarnan Canal
Video footage of the canal and coaching inn

Hamlets in Stirling (council area)